is a coal-fired thermal power station operated by Tohoku Electric in the city of Noshiro, Akita, Japan. The facility is located on the Sea of Japan coast of Honshu.

History
The Noshiro Thermal Power Station was initially conceived as a countermeasure against possible shortages in power generation which might arise due to issues such as the 1973 oil crisis. Unit 1 began operations in May 1993. Due to issues with carbon emissions, Unit 2 was completed in December 1994 to burn a mixture of heavy oil and biomass (wood chip residue).  Also to improve power generation efficiency, Unit 2 adopted Tohoku Electric's first ultra-supercritical boiler and steam turbine with a main steam temperature of 566 ° C, a reheat steam temperature of 593 ° C, and a main steam pressure of 24.1 MPa.

The completion of Unit 3 was delayed due to uncertainty in future power demand and economic trends, as well as increased pressure on Japan from overseas to reduce carbon dioxide emissions. However, following the Tōhoku earthquake and tsunami  in March 2011, work was restarted in February 2016 with an estimated completion date by the end of March 2020.

Generating Units

Operational

See also 

 Energy in Japan
 List of power stations in Japan

References

External links

Tohoku Electric list of major power stations

1993 establishments in Japan
Energy infrastructure completed in 1993
Coal-fired power stations in Japan
Biofuel power stations in Japan
Noshiro, Akita
Buildings and structures in Akita Prefecture